Sonny Jiménez de Tejada (1922 – 5 May 2014) was the first Colombian woman to earn an engineering degree in Colombia. Additionally, she held various political positions, such as Deputy of the Departmental Assembly of Antioquia in 1968, Secretary of Administrative Services of the Medellín municipal office in 1975 and executive director of the Prodevelopment Corporation of the Faculty of Mines.

Biography
Sonny Jiménez de Tejada was born  Sonny Jiménez Arbeláez in January 1922 in Medellín, Colombia. In 1941, she entered the Faculty of Mines of the National University of Colombia, where she graduated as a civil and mining engineer in 1946 as the first woman to do so. Later, she completed a Master of Science in Civil Engineering, at the Carnegie Institute of Technology in 1948. She went on to complete a masters in Urban Physical Planning at the National University of Colombia in Medellin in 1976. She worked with the Women's Professional Association encouraging women to study engineering.

Tejada was celebrated for her work and contribution to women's access to higher education in Colombia.

Personal life
Tejada married fellow engineer José Tejada Sáenz. They had five children, one of whom is a professor of mathematics Débora Tejada. He died in 2011.Tejada died on May 5, 2014 in Medellín.

References

1922 births
2014 deaths
Colombian civil engineers
Carnegie Mellon University alumni
Colombian expatriates in the United States
Colombian women engineers